Milan Smit (born  13 February 2003) is a Dutch footballer who plays as a forward for SC Cambuur.

Career
He made his professional debut in the Eredivisie appearing for SC Cambuur at the Cambuur Stadion in a 2-1 defeat to NAC Breda on 3 April 2022. Smit scored his first professional goal when he bagged a 95th minute equaliser against RKC Waalwijk at the Cambuur Stadion in the Eredivisie on 6 May, 2022. Smit voiced to the media that such a goal was a prime motivator to him over the summer of 2022 to prove that he’s more than a ‘one goal
wonder’.

References

External links
 

Living people
2003 births
SC Cambuur players
Dutch footballers
Eredivisie players
21st-century Dutch people